Classical South Florida was a radio network serving South Florida, owned by the American Public Media Group. Its stations carried classical music programming from American Public Media's Classical 24 service, as well as programs such as Performance Today, SymphonyCast, Pipedreams, and Saint Paul Sunday. Its stations were also affiliated with National Public Radio, carrying its hourly news bulletins.
WPBI-HD2 and W270AD carried news and talk programming from NPR and other sources.

Stations
 WKCP 89.7 MHz, Miami, Florida (now WMLV)
 WNPS 88.7 MHz, Fort Myers, Florida (now WDLV)
 WPBI 90.7 MHz, West Palm Beach, Florida (now WFLV)
 W214BD 90.7 Gifford, Florida (Vero Beach, Florida)
 W270AD 101.9 MHz, West Palm Beach, Florida (relays WFLV-HD2 (WPBI-HD2), as "101.9 WPBI News")

With insufficient funding, the entire network was purchased by Educational Media Foundation for programming the CCM format, K-Love in July 2015. However, NPR's newscasts and its HD2 channel (which featured NPR's talk programming) continued on its West Palm Beach outlet, now WFLV. It has since been replaced by Air1.

References

Radio stations in Florida
NPR member stations
Classical music radio stations in the United States
American Public Media Group
Defunct radio broadcasting companies of the United States
Defunct radio stations in the United States
Radio stations established in 2008
Radio stations disestablished in 2015
2008 establishments in Florida
2015 disestablishments in Florida